Whitford is a village, community and an electoral ward near Holywell in Flintshire, northeast Wales. The population of both the community and the ward taken at the 2011 census was 2,332. The community includes the villages of Carmel, Lloc, Gorsedd and Pantasaph.

It is best known as the former home of traveller and writer Thomas Pennant.

The parish church of St Mary and St Beuno is thought to have been founded by St Beuno in the 7th century and later re-dedicated to St Mary after the Norman conquest. It was restored in the 19th century and is a grade I listed building.

The Whitford electoral ward is coterminous with the community and elects one county councillor to Flintshire County Council.

References

External links 

Photos of Whitford and surrounding area on geograph.org.uk
Whitford Community Council Website

Villages in Flintshire
Communities in Flintshire
Wards of Flintshire